Eretis herewardi is a species of butterfly in the family Hesperiidae. It is found in Angola, the Democratic Republic of the Congo, Uganda, Kenya, Tanzania, Zambia, Malawi and Mozambique. The habitat consists of woodland.

Subspecies
Eretis herewardi herewardi - Democratic Republic of the Congo, Uganda, western Kenya, Tanzania, Zambia, Malawi, Mozambique
Eretis herewardi rotundimacula Evans, 1937 - Angola

References

Butterflies described in 1921
Celaenorrhinini